Clivina media is a species of ground beetle in the subfamily Scaritinae. It was described by Jules Putzeys in 1846.

References

media
Beetles described in 1846